West End is a suburb of the New Zealand city of Palmerston North.

Features of the suburb include the Victoria Esplanade, Lido Swimming complex, Palmerston North Bowling Club, Palmerston North Holiday Park, Te Awe Awe Scout Group and Manawatu Lawn Tennis Centre. The local Fitzherbert Park is the city's main cricket and rugby league park. Other parks include Ongley Park, Manawaroa Park, West End Skate Park, State Highway 56 Reserve and Savage Reserve.

Demographics

It had a population of 4,914 at the 2018 New Zealand census, an increase of 198 people (4.2%) since the 2013 census, and an increase of 276 people (6.0%) since the 2006 census. There were 1,893 households. There were 2,325 males and 2,586 females, giving a sex ratio of 0.9 males per female, with 816 people (16.6%) aged under 15 years, 1,623 (33.0%) aged 15 to 29, 1,923 (39.1%) aged 30 to 64, and 552 (11.2%) aged 65 or older.

Ethnicities were 68.9% European/Pākehā, 16.4% Māori, 5.0% Pacific peoples, 19.8% Asian, and 3.8% other ethnicities (totals add to more than 100% since people could identify with multiple ethnicities).

The proportion of people born overseas was 28.7%, compared with 27.1% nationally.

Although some people objected to giving their religion, 50.2% had no religion, 32.5% were Christian, 3.4% were Hindu, 3.4% were Muslim, 1.6% were Buddhist and 3.1% had other religions.

Of those at least 15 years old, 1,170 (28.6%) people had a bachelor or higher degree, and 525 (12.8%) people had no formal qualifications. The employment status of those at least 15 was that 1,782 (43.5%) people were employed full-time, 672 (16.4%) were part-time, and 216 (5.3%) were unemployed.

Education

Students travel to Monrad Intermediate for Year 7 and 8.

References

Suburbs of Palmerston North
Populated places on the Manawatū River